It's Only Life After All is an 2023 American documentary film, directed, produced, and edited by Alexandria Bombach. It follows the lives and careers of the band Indigo Girls.

It had its world premiere at the 2023 Sundance Film Festival on January 19, 2023.

Premise
Follows the career and lives of the band Indigo Girls.

Production
In May 2020, it was announced Alexandria Bombach would direct a documentary film revolving around Indigo Girls. Initially the documentary was set to follow the band on tour in a Cinéma vérité style, but the COVID-19 pandemic changed the way the way the film was made. During post-production, Bombach had 1,000 hours of footage to work with.

Release
The film had its world premiere at the 2023 Sundance Film Festival on January 19, 2023.

Reception

References

External links
 

2023 films
2023 documentary films
American documentary films
Documentary films about musical groups
Documentary films about women in music
2020s American films
2023 LGBT-related films
Documentary films about lesbians
American LGBT-related films